Igor Yuryevich Yamushev (born 21 August 1981) is a former Russian professional football player.

Club career
He played in the Russian Football National League for FC Torpedo-Viktoriya Nizhny Novgorod in 1999.

See also
Football in Russia

References

1981 births
Sportspeople from Nizhny Novgorod
Living people
Russian footballers
Association football defenders
FC Torpedo NN Nizhny Novgorod players
FC Rotor Volgograd players